= Normandy (Le Havre) =

Historic Art Deco theatre in Le Havre, France

Le Normandy
- Interactive map of Le Normandy
- Location: Le Havre, France
- Coordinates: 49.501101°N 0.143556°E
- Owner: Jessy Spahija
- Operator: LE NORMANDY LH
- Capacity: 789
- Type: Theatre

Construction
- Opened: 1934
- Architect: Henri Daigue

Website
- theatrelenormandy.com

Le Normandy is a neighborhood cinema that later became a theatre, located at 387 rue Aristide-Briand, in the Montmorency district of Le Havre, in Seine-Maritime, Normandy. Built in the early 1930s in an Art Deco style, it was closed to the public in 1991 before experiencing a long period of abandonment. Saved from demolition by the Spahija family, it has been the subject of a major rehabilitation project launched in the early 2020s, leading to a gradual reopening from 2023 and an official inauguration in late November 2025.

== History ==
Le Normandy was built in 1933 and opened to the public in 1934. It quickly became an emblematic venue in Le Havre's cultural life, successively hosting film screenings, concerts, and live performances.

Closed in 1991, notably because it could not meet safety standards, the building remained abandoned for more than thirty years.

In 1999, Sylvia and Korap Spahija acquired the site. After Korap Spahija's death in 2020, their children took over the project and began major preservation works, supported in particular by the Association de Sauvetage du Patrimoine Havrais (A.S.P.H.).

== Works and rehabilitation ==
The rehabilitation spans nearly five years and involves dozens of local companies, for an estimated cost of around three million euros.

After nine months of preparation and works, the building's Art Deco façade—restored identically based on chromatic studies and old photographs—was unveiled in September 2021. This restoration was carried out in partnership with the Association de Sauvetage du Patrimoine Havrais

In August 2023, the municipality lifted the dangerous-building order (arrêté de péril) affecting the site. The entrance hall was completed in December 2023, followed in 2024 by the renovation of the roof over the main auditorium. As reopening approached, the artists’ dressing rooms and restrooms were also completed.

== Gradual reopening ==
At the end of 2023, the renovated hall reopened to the public. With a capacity of 99 people, it is equipped with sound and projection systems as well as a bar, allowing exhibitions, cultural events, and private functions to be held while awaiting the theatre's full reopening.

== Official reopening ==
The full reopening of the theatre Le Normandy is scheduled for late November 2025, marking the launch of its first cultural season after thirty-four years of closure. The official inauguration takes place over three days, from 28 to 30 November 2025.

On this occasion, an original musical comedy entitled Il était une fois le Normandy is presented, written by Jessy Spahija, recounting the venue's history and performed by around twenty professional artists.

== Architecture and facilities ==
Le Normandy's main auditorium can accommodate up to 789 seated spectators. The works include the installation of a specific slab designed to absorb low frequencies in order to limit noise nuisance for local residents. The balconies are also being restored, one of them being recreated under the name “Paradis”.

Additional spaces, including a room of around one hundred seats called Le Petit Normandy, intended in particular for stand-up and for show try-outs, are to be completed later.

== Cultural heritage ==
Over the course of its history, Le Normandy hosted many renowned performers, including Édith Piaf, Yves Montand, Jacques Brel, Frank Sinatra, Georges Brassens, Duke Ellington, Sidney Bechet, Bourvil, Annie Cordy, Gilbert Bécaud, Téléphone, Trust, and Motörhead.

== In popular culture ==
A comic book entitled Retour au Normandy, announced for February 2024, retraces the venue's history from its inauguration in 1934 to its contemporary revival, notably evoking its abandonment in the 1990s and its requisition during the German occupation.

== Timeline ==
- 1933: construction of the building
- 1934: opened to the public
- 1991: closure of Le Normandy
- 1999: acquired by Sylvia and Korap Spahija
- 2020: death of Korap Spahija
- 2021: restoration and unveiling of the façade
- 2023: lifting of the arrêté de péril and reopening of the hall
- 28–30 November 2025: official inauguration of the theatre

== Bibliography ==
- Retour au Normandy, Édifice éd. — 2024 — Matthieu Teulé et Jessy Spahija ISBN 978-2494827042
